Tubulinyl-Tyr carboxypeptidase (carboxypeptidase-tubulin, soluble carboxypeptidase, tubulin-tyrosine carboxypeptidase, tubulin carboxypeptidase, tubulinyltyrosine carboxypeptidase, tyrosinotubulin carboxypeptidase, tyrosyltubulin carboxypeptidase, TTCPase, brain I carboxypeptidase) is an enzyme. This enzyme catalyses the following chemical reaction

 Cleavage of the -Glu--Tyr bond to release the C-terminal tyrosine residue from the native tyrosinated tubulin. Inactive on Z-Glu-Tyr

This enzyme is active at neutral pH.

This activity has been linked to proteins such as AGTPBP1 in human.

References

External links 
 

EC 3.4.17